Loke Yew CMG (1845–1917), born Wong Loke Yew was a Malayan business magnate of Cantonese descent. During his lifetime, he played a significant role in the development of Kuala Lumpur and was also one of the founding fathers of Victoria Institution in Kuala Lumpur.

Early life
Loke was born of humble parentage in Dongjiang village, Heshan district, Guangdong province, China, in 1845. He was the only son in a family of four children, and spent his childhood working as a farm hand before he decided to set sail to Malaya to seek his fortune. He was only 13 years old then. The young Wong dropped his surname Wong upon arriving in Singapore, and changed his middle name to 陸(Lù) and adopted it as his surname as he thought the new name sounded more auspicious. His relatives recommended him for his first job at Kwong Man General Store, a provision shop in Market Street and earned $20 a month. The young Loke scrimped and managed to save $99 after 4 years of hard work. With the money, he started his own provision store called Tong Hing Loong. His business gradually grew and Loke left his staff, Cheong Yoke Choy, in charge of the store while he travelled to northern Malaya, particularly Perak to explore the tin mining business.

Businesses
The ambitious young man took great risks in his new venture in Perak, and lost nearly $60,000 in his first four years. But he persisted in keeping the business going until he found a rich tin deposit in Kelian Bahru in Perak. His tin-mining business suddenly took an upswing, and Loke then went on to acquire and own many more tin mines, and rubber and coconut plantations in Perak. He also ventured into supplying provisions to British troops during the Perak War, running a pawnbroking business, and even obtained monopoly for liquor sales, gambling licences and other privileges from the colonial government.

Loke's other assets included several hundred hectares of land, real estate and properties in both Singapore, Malaya, Hong Kong and China. Loke Yew was the largest shareholder in Pahang Motor Car Service, owned shares in the Raub Straits Trading Company, Straits Steamship and Federal Engineers, partly owned Burmah Rice Mill, made investments in properties all over Singapore and Malaya.  He played a leading role along with his grand-nephews (grandsons of one of his sisters) named Cheong Yoke Choy and Cheong Yoke Choong in establishing Kwong Yik Bank, which opened in July 1915.

Loke also went into partnership with Thamboosamy Pillai in managing the New Tin Mining Company in Rawang. They were the first to use electric pumps for mining in Malaya.

In 1936, his son, Loke Wan Tho, along with his fourth wife, Lim Cheng Kim established Associated Theatres Ltd—later renamed Cathay Organisation. In 1939 the Loke conglomerate built Singapore's first skyscraper, the Cathay Building.

Family life

Loke Yew was unusual for his era in that he was a serial monogamist when polygamy was more commonly practised and accepted.  He married four times upon the deaths of each of his prior wives.  His first wife, Leung Suet, bore him three sons: Wan Piu, Wan Chok and Wan Chiew.  His second wife, Leung Jun, bore him a daughter, Yuen Hing.  He also adopted a hardworking employee named Hon Chow as a son during this marriage (this adopted son subsequently changed his surname to Loke but left his given name unchanged and so was the only son without the generational component in his name of "Wan" common to all the biological male children of Loke Yew who were born before and after him).  Loke Yew's third wife, Lim Shuk Kwei bore him three children – a daughter, Yuen Ying (a.k.a. "Juliann") and two sons, Wan Wye (a.k.a. "Alan") and Wan Yat.  His fourth wife, Lim Cheng Kim, whom he married in 1914, bore him three children – a son, Wan Tho, and two daughters, Yuen Theng and Yuen Peng. In total the elder Loke had 11 children from all 4 marriages, including his adopted son.  In a deviation from custom where children, biological or otherwise (and their descendants, if any), who predeceased the parent receiving nothing in inheritance and despite Loke Hon Chow predeceasing Loke Yew, Loke Yew ensured that Loke Hon Chow's male descendants bearing the Loke surname (this rule also extended to his biological children) were included in his Will.  In another deviation from custom, Loke Yew also attempted to formally educate both his sons and daughters (in those days, daughters were seldom formally educated since they were married off into other clans while sons brought their wives into the clan).  He sent some of his children to Robert Gordon's College in Aberdeen, Scotland, for their formal education that was unfortunately interrupted by the onset of World War II whereupon they returned home to British Malaya.

Loke Yew arrived in Kuala Lumpur in the late 1880s and stayed there for the last thirty years of his life.  The Loke Mansion situated at No. 273A, Jalan Medan Tuanku, was built by Loke Yew over 12 years from 1892, the year he bought over the residence of tin miner and leader of the Cantonese community, Mr Cheow Ah Yoke. The Loke Mansion in its present form was completed in 1904 and was part of the former sprawling  Loke Estate. The Cheow home which was built between 1860 and 1862 with the famous Ching dynasty "Painted Gate" has been incorporated into the rear portion of the current Loke Mansion. Loke made sure his mansion became one of the most prestigious residences in Asia and was reputedly the first residence in Malaya to receive electricity. Loke's family lived there until the 1930s.

The Loke Mansion, accessible within walking distance from the  Medan Tuanku Monorail station, was renovated and partially restored in late 2007 by the law firm Cheang and Ariff, who have leased the property from its owner. Managing Partner, Dato' Loh Siew Cheang, hopes to be able to restore the mansion to its full glory in the course of time.

The Loke Mansion should not be confused with Loke Hall, Kuala Lumpur (which is now occupied by Persatuan Arkitek Malaysia or PAM) or Loke Villa, Penang (which is still a private residence owned by the Loke family and is visible to the public from Gurney Drive).  Loke Villa in Penang was one of the first houses in South East Asia to possess an intercom system linking all the main rooms due to its sprawling nature.

Loke Wan Yat, one of his less mentioned sons, was a real estate developer and the co-owner of Penang Realty Ltd based in Penang.

Contributions
Loke Yew was a canny businessman, who was excessively cautious with petty expenditure. Despite his wealth he was least expensively dressed man in his own office, owned second-hand motorcars and often went to work by rickshaw instead. There is a story that one rainy day his wife went in their car to fetch him home from their estate and found him soaking wet, with a hoe in hand showing a coolie how to dig. This showed his humility, and willingness to help others in need.

The successful businessman also strongly believed in the importance of education and was one of the founders, together with Thamboosamy Pillai, who established Victoria Institution and even donated a large sum of money to Methodist Boys' School Kuala Lumpur for them to build a field.  He also lend help to many charitable causes, including the establishment of the Tan Tock Seng Hospital in Singapore. His philanthropy earned him a seat on the Selangor State Council and many honours. Loke also collected $55,000 for the endowment fund in 1912 for The University of Hong Kong and made a loan of $500,000 to the university interest-free for 25 years dating from 1915. He was the first Chinese to be awarded an honorary degree by the university, and Loke Hall in HKU was subsequently named in his honour.

Honours
Loke Yew's many contributions to education and the growth of Kuala Lumpur earned him many honours. As Loke Yew was one of the pioneers of the developing Kuala Lumpur town, he was conferred the Companion of the Order of St Michael and St George (CMG) from the British Government in the 1915 New Year Honours, for his efforts and contributions on helping the people and the government of British Malaya.

Loke Yew was also conferred an honorary Doctor of Laws (LL.D.) by the University of Hong Kong, for his generous contribution and steadfast belief in the value of education.

In tribute to the man's enormous contributions to society, the name "Loke Yew" has become identifiable with street names such as Loke Yew Street in Singapore, and Jalan Loke Yew in Kuala Lumpur (KL) and the name also appeared in several towns in Malaysia. Known as Jalan Loke Yew in Malay, this road together with Jalan Cheras makes up the Cheras Highway, built by Metramac Corporation and maintained and managed by Kuala Lumpur City Hall. It is part of the Federal Route 1 system. This road in KL is also known for its high traffic volume and congestion especially during peak hours, for its low-cost flats and the Viva Home shopping complex.. One of the Besraya Expressway's two toll plazas is named Loke Yew Toll Plaza, located just adjacent to the toll road's interchange with Jalan Loke Yew.

One of the sport houses in the Victoria Institution is named Loke Yew and is assigned the colour brown.

Loke Yew Professorship in Pathology
In the spirit of continuing education, The University of Hong Kong (HKU) celebrated its Third Inauguration of Endowed Professorships on 17 April 2008, with the inception of the "Loke Yew Professorship in Pathology". This Professorship was established through the generosity of Mr Loke Yew's grandchildren, Ms Ruby Loke Yuen-Kin and Professor Charlie Loke Yung-Wai, as a testimony of the strong ties between the Hong Kong university and the Loke Family.

Death
Loke Yew died on 24 February 1917 from malaria and his funeral was one of the grandest of those times. He was buried at Hawthornden Estate (a rubber estate he owned) in Setiawangsa constituency in north-eastern Kuala Lumpur, presently close to where army quarters of the Ministry of Defence (MinDef) are located, and a bronze statue of him was erected in front of his grave.  Loke Yew also contributed to the Chinese communities in China, Hong Kong, Singapore and Taiwan. Loke Yew left an estate estimated at over £10 million a business empire composed of rubber plantations, factories and banks.

Loke Yew Family Graveyard
The Loke Yew Family Graveyard was built in 1910. The graveyard was originally located at what was known as Hawthornden Estate and today it is surrounded by Jalan Jelatek and Jalan Semarak, near the Desa Tun Hussein Onn (a housing complex for army personnel) in Setiawangsa, Kuala Lumpur, where it is difficult for civilians to access the site. The Loke Yew Tombs complex consists of two buildings: The grand Tsui Lan Memorial Hall built with timber pavilions with its eclectic blend of Chinese and Western styles and the impressive larger-than-life bronze statue of Loke Yew erected inline with his tomb. The statue was designed by Mr. Frederick J. Wilcoxson. It is currently in less than ideal condition but repairs (funded by his grandchildren, Ruby Loke Yuen Kin and Choo Mei Leen) have been effected as much as possible within the constraints of custom and the lack of skilled artisans nowadays (a lot of the decorations involve bas-relief, which would entail wholesale replacement of the underlying material for complete restoration and thus would amount to desecration of the gravesite if done).  The current location of the MinDef facilities surrounding the gravesite ensure future vandalism would be minimised if not altogether prevented.

The tomb complex is oriented to the West, the vertical axis of Loke Yew's tomb and bronze statue are inline, while the other three tombs (Lim Shuk Kwei, Alan Loke Wan Wye and Loke Wan Tho) are slightly off with this line to its right. This is the traditional Chinese way of showing respect to the husband or father. The Loke tombs follow the traditional Fujian style of a square front courtyard with granite carved Imperial guardian lions for the purpose of "guarding" the graves (the Chinese strongly believe that lions are the guardian of buildings). Within this courtyard, the altar itself is protected by a circular concrete fence. The Tsui Lan Memorial Hall is a rare and uncommon building, the style of which is not found elsewhere.

See also
Dato Loke Wan Tho
Lim Cheng Kim
Cheong Yoke Choy
Cathay Building
Cathay Organisation
University of Hong Kong
Victoria Institution

References

External links

 Biography of Loke Yew – Andrewkidz Collections Library
 The Demise of the Revenue Farm System in the Federated Malay States 
 When the `towkay' reigned
 Honoree: Choo Meileen
 The original media man, INVESTOR DIGEST
 The original media man
 Interview with the grandson of Loke Yew and Reproductive Immunologist Dr. Charlie Loke Yung Wai by Alan Macfarlane, 22 February 2007 – Interview provides insight into his grandfather Loke Yew and the family.
 Kington among men, by Allan Koay, The Star Online, 26 March 2003 – Obituary on Dato' Kington Loo (d. 21 March 2003)

1845 births
1917 deaths
Chinese emigrants to Malaysia
Companions of the Order of St Michael and St George
Malaysian people of Cantonese descent
Malaysian chief executives
Malaysian philanthropists
People from Heshan
Singaporean chief executives
Singaporean people of Cantonese descent
Singaporean philanthropists